William Rennison Livingstone (8 February 1929 – March 2011) was a Scottish professional footballer who played as a centre half in the Football League for Reading, Chelsea and Brentford.

Playing career

Reading 
Livingstone began his career in Scotland as a right back at junior club Ardeer Recreation, before securing a move to English Third Division South club Reading in April 1949. He had a slow start to life at Elm Park and failed make a first team breakthrough until the 1953–54 season, when he managed 31 league appearances. His appearances tailed off the following year and he departed the club at the end of the 1954–55 season. Livingstone made 52 appearances and scored two goals in six years with the Royals.

Chelsea 
Livingstone moved to First Division club Chelsea in June 1955. He had to wait until November 1956 to enjoy a run in the team, when he made 12 appearances at centre half, before losing his place in January 1957. Livingstone was released at the end of the 1958–59 season and made just 22 appearances during four years at Stamford Bridge.

Brentford 
Livingstone dropped to the Third Division to join Chelsea's West London neighbours Brentford on a free transfer in July 1959. Signed as cover for the injured Ian Dargie, Livingstone found himself behind Sid Russell in the pecking order in the first month of the 1959–60 season, before breaking into the team in September 1959 and holding down his place until January 1960, when Dargie returned to fitness. Livingstone was released in May 1960, after making 21 appearances for Brentford.

Hastings United 
Livingstone dropped into non-League football to join Southern League Premier Division club Hastings United in 1960.

Career statistics

References

1929 births
Footballers from Greenock
Scottish footballers
Brentford F.C. players
English Football League players
2011 deaths
Chelsea F.C. players
Reading F.C. players
Hastings United F.C. (1948) players
Association football wing halves
Association football fullbacks
Southern Football League players
Scottish Junior Football Association players